HD 167714, also known as HR 6837, is a solitary, orange hued star located in the southern circumpolar constellation Octans. It has apparent magnitude of 5.95, allowing it to be faintly visible to the naked eye. Based on parallax measurements from Gaia, the object is estimated to be 359 light years distant.

This is an evolved red giant with a stellar classification of K2 III. It appears to be on the red giant branch, generating energy by fusing a hydrogen shell around an inert helium core. At present it has 1.4 times the mass of the Sun and at the age of two billion years, it has expanded to 12.3 times its girth.

References

167714
090606
6837
PD-80 00849
Octantis, 32
Octans
K-type giants